Harold Ford Gardner (December 3, 1898 – October 16, 2006) was a veteran of the First World War, although he served for less than 24 hours in the United States Army.

Gardner was born in Pennsylvania and enlisted for military duty in 1918. He was on a train ready to go to a boot camp on 11 November 1918, the day the armistice was signed, when he was ordered off by an officer. Gardner received a $1 check for one day's pay.

This is only one of hundreds of stories from Harold's long life. He was a master mechanic and machinist who worked for IBM, Endicott Johnson, City of Binghamton, and Link Aviation as well as Pratt-Whitney during the Second World War, troubleshooting aircraft engines. He loved to work on antique cars, clocks and guns, and could often be found in his workshop making replacement parts when none could be obtained.

He died in Sayre.

See also

Veterans of World War I who died in 2006

External links
 "Train duty", Pittsburgh Tribune-Review, November 11, 2005 (archived link, February 6, 2006)
 "Doughboy for a day", Pittsburgh Tribune-Review, by Allison M. Heinrichs, October 21, 2006, retrieved April 11, 2015

1898 births
2006 deaths
American centenarians
Men centenarians
United States Army personnel of World War I
People from Bradford County, Pennsylvania
United States Army soldiers
IBM people